This is a list of various species of invertebrates, animals without a backbone, that are commonly found in brackish aquariums kept by hobby aquarists. Some species are intentionally collected for their desirable aesthetic characteristics. Others are kept to serve a functional role such as consuming algae in the aquarium. Some species are present only incidentally or are pest species.

Arthropods

Crustaceans
Fiddler Crab, Uca pugnax
Perisesarma bidens, Red Clawed Crab

Amano Shrimp/Yamato Shrimp, Caridina multidentata

Grass Shrimp/Glass Shrimp, Palaemonetes paludosus

Blue Crab, Callinectes sapidus

Mollusca

Gastropods
Olive Nerite, Vittina usnea

Cephalopods
Lolliguncula is the only genus of cephalopods that is known to exist in brackish water. They can tolerate as low as 8.5 PPM of salt.
 Subgenus Loliopsis
 Dart squid, Lolliguncula diomedea
 Subgenus Lolliguncula
 Argus brief squid or Argus thumbstall squid, Lolliguncula argus
 Atlantic brief squid or Atlantic thumbstall squid, Lolliguncula brevis 
 Panama brief squid or Panama thumbstall squid, Lolliguncula panamensis

References

Fishkeeping
Lists of invertebrates
Brackish aquarium invertebrates